"All My Hope" is a song performed by American contemporary Christian music singer Crowder featuring Tauren Wells, released as a standalone single on September 8, 2017. Crowder had released the original version of the song on his second studio album, American Prodigal (2016). Crowder co-wrote the song with Jeff Sojka and Ben Glover.

"All My Hope" peaked at No. 3 on the US Hot Christian Songs chart. "All My Hope" was nominated for the GMA Dove Awards for Song of the Year and Pop/Contemporary Recorded Song of the Year at the 2018 GMA Dove Awards.

Background
The original version of "All My Hope" was released by Crowder as a track on his second studio album, American Prodigal, on September 23, 2016. Crowder shared the story behind the song, saying:

Composition
"All My Hope" is composed in the key of A♭ Major with a tempo of 127 beats per minute.

Reception

Critical response
Joshua Andre of 365 Days of Inspiring Media gave a positive review of the single, saying the quickened tempo and added instrumentation made "a fuller sound and maybe a richness and a depth that isn’t heard on the piano prominent original version." Andre also opined that Tauren Wells' vocals enhanced the song.

Accolades

Commercial performance
"All My Hope" debuted at number 43 on the US Christian Airplay chart dated September 2, 2017. "All My Hope" debuted at number 46 on the US Hot Christian Songs chart dated September 9, 2017, "All My Hope" peaked at number three on the Hot Christian Songs chart dated March 10, 2018, and spent a total of thirty-eight weeks on the chart. The song reached number one on the Christian Airplay chart dated March 17, 2018, becoming Crowder's second Christian Airplay number one single.

Music videos
Crowder released audio video of "All My Hope" featuring Tauren Wells, showcasing the single artwork on YouTube on September 15, 2017. On October 20, 2017, Crowder released the official music video for "All My Hope" featuring Tauren Wells on YouTube. Crowder published the lyric video of "All My Hope" featuring Tauren Wells on October 25, 2017.

Charts

Weekly charts

Year-end charts

Certifications

Release history

Other versions
 Passion released a live rendition of the song featuring Crowder and Tauren Wells on their album, Whole Heart (2018).

References

External links
 

2017 singles
Crowder (musician) songs
Tauren Wells songs
Sparrow Records singles
Songs written by Ed Cash